Aflenz Land was a municipality in Austria which merged in January 2015 into Aflenz in the Bruck-Mürzzuschlag District of Styria, Austria.

As of 1 January 2015, Aflenz Land has been amalgamated with Aflenz Kurort municipality into Marktgemeinde Aflenz (i.e. Aflenz Market Town).

References

Cities and towns in Bruck-Mürzzuschlag District